Michael "Cub" Koda (born October 1, 1948 – July 1, 2000) was an American rock and roll singer, guitarist, songwriter, disc jockey, music critic, and record compiler. Rolling Stone magazine considered him best known for writing the song "Smokin' in the Boys Room", recorded by Brownsville Station, which reached number 3 on the 1974 Billboard chart. He co-wrote and edited the All Music Guide to the Blues, and Blues for Dummies, and selected a version of each of the classic blues songs on the CD accompanying the book. He also wrote liner notes for the Trashmen, Jimmy Reed, J. B. Hutto, the Kingsmen, and the Miller Sisters, among others.

Early life and career
Koda was born in Detroit, Michigan, and graduated from Manchester High School, in Manchester, Michigan. He became interested in music as a boy, learning drums by the age of 5, and by the time he was in high school he had formed his own group, the Del-Tinos, which played rockabilly, rock and  roll, and blues. The band released its first single, "Go Go Go" (a version of a Roy Orbison recording), in the fall of 1963. They released two more singles but broke up in 1966, when Koda wanted to pursue other options.

Koda spent a year attending Northern Michigan University in Marquette, Michigan. Koda formed and reformed several bands at this time with other musicians in the area. His original songs and over the top performances drew crowds everywhere the band played. His habit of playing a guitar with a 'y' cord plugged into two Fender Twin Reverb amps gave him plenty of volume. He also played harp and slide guitar. After a year Koda decided college wasn't his thing and moved to Las Vegas where he worked as a sideman. This was his springboard to forming Brownsville Station. The last incarnation of his backing band regrouped as Walrus and became a local and midwest institution in their own right.

Brownsville Station
Koda then worked as a solo artist, releasing two singles, "I Got My Mojo Workin'" and "Ramblin' on My Mind", and working with a couple of bands, before forming Brownsville Station in 1969. Formed in Ann Arbor, Michigan, Brownsville Station also included drummer T. J. Cronley, bassist Tony Driggins, guitarist Mike Lutz, and later Bruce Nazarian and Henry Weck. The group was influenced by Chuck Berry, Bo Diddley, the Who, Jerry Lee Lewis, and Link Wray.

The band began performing throughout the American Midwest and released several singles before getting noticed. They released their first album in 1970. The 1973 single "Smokin' in the Boys Room" remains their best-known song. It went to number 3 on the Billboard Hot 100 chart and eventually sold over two million copies. They continued to perform until disbanding in 1979.

Other recordings by Brownsville Station include "The Martian Boogie", "I Get So Excited", "Rock & Roll Holiday", "Hey Little Girl", "Mama Don't Allow No Parkin'", "I Got It Bad for You", "Kings of the Party", "I'm the Leader of the Gang", "Let Your Yeah Be Yeah" (the title is from Matthew 5:37), "Lady (Put the Light on Me)," "Wanted (Dead or Alive)", and "Barefootin'" (the B-side of "Smokin' in the Boys Room). "Smokin' in the Boys Room" was later covered by Mötley Crüe.

At some point in the mid-70's Cub and Brownsville Station roadies created and recorded an intentionally inept oldies band named "King Uszniewicz and His Uszniewicztones" with Cub masquerading as frontman Ernie Uszniewicz on saxophone. The band recorded and pressed a 45 of "Surfin' School/Cry On My Shoulder" which, according to the Michigan Rock And Roll Legends Hall of Fame, was discreetly placed in Midwest thrift stores by members of Brownsville Station while on tour, creating the illusion amongst record collectors that the band had been real. The prank was furthered by four LP released by Norton Records between 1989 and 2011, all of which feature a photo of the face of Cub's father George Uszniewicz on the cover.

After Brownsville Station
Before the breakup of the band Koda purchased a multitrack recorder and started producing one-man-band tapes of rockabilly, blues, R&B, country, early rock and roll, and jazz, which he released as the album That's What I Like About the South. He became more focused on performing solo. He also began writing for numerous music magazines, notably his column "The Vinyl Junkie" for Goldmine Magazine (later for DISCoveries). He wrote three volumes of the acclaimed Blues Masters series. He also wrote reviews and contributed to books published by AllMusic.

From late 1979 to late 1980, Koda began playing with three members of a Detroit-based band, Mugsy, calling themselves Cub Koda and the Points. Their eponymous debut album was released in early 1980 by the Boston-based Baron Records on hot pink vinyl. Also released was an EP, "Shake Yo Cakes." Because of financial difficulties, the band broke up in late 1980 before releasing a second album.

By 1980, Koda was performing with Hound Dog Taylor's backing band, the Houserockers, with guitarist Brewer Phillips and drummer Ted Harvey. They performed and recorded together for 15 years. The group's first album was It's the Blues, released in 1981. Their second album, The Joint Was Rockin' , was released in 1996. Throughout the 1980s and 1990s, Koda continued his busy schedule of touring, recording, and writing. The compilation album Smokin' in the Boy's Room: The Best of Brownsville Station, was released by Rhino Records in 1993, and Welcome to My Job, a retrospective of his non-Brownsville recordings, was released by Blue Wave Records  in the same year. The following year the album Abba Dabba Dabba: A Bananza of Hits was released by Schoolkids Records. He recorded a solo album, Box Lunch, released by J-Bird Records in 1997, and recordings he made with the Del-Tinos were released by Norton Records in 1998. He also re-formed Cub Koda and the Points and released Noise Monkeys (one of his last works) in 2000.

Death
On June 30, 2000, while promoting his new album, he became ill. Although he had been recovering from kidney disease, which required dialysis, Koda died the next day in Chelsea, Michigan, at the age of 51. He is buried in Mount Hope Cemetery in Waterloo, Michigan. His headstone features a Fender amp, with a microphone and harmonica resting on top of it. "I Will Always Love You, If Only in my Dreams" is inscribed on the tablet.

A song by Koda, "You're the Only Girl (Delores)", was included on the tribute album Daddy Rockin' Strong: A Tribute to Nolan Strong & the Diablos, released by The Wind Records in August 2010 and distributed by Norton Records. The song was included on Koda's 1994 album Abba Dabba Dabba, which had only limited release. A notable and plaintive song was "Random Drug Test", which featured the refrain "Pee in the cup." Cub Koda was inducted into the Michigan Rock and Roll Legends Hall of Fame in 2016.

References

External links
Cub Koda at Find a Grave
Cub Koda discography at Discogs
Del-Tinos discography at Discogs
Brownsville Station discography at Discogs
King Uszniewicz discography at Discogs

1948 births
2000 deaths
AllMusic
American rock guitarists
American male guitarists
American rock singers
American rock songwriters
American male songwriters
Deaths from kidney failure
Musicians from Ann Arbor, Michigan
20th-century American singers
20th-century American guitarists
Songwriters from Michigan
Singers from Detroit
Guitarists from Detroit
20th-century American male musicians